Union Gap School District No. 2 is a public school school district in Yakima County, Washington, USA and serves the town of Union Gap.  Grades K through 8th attend the school.  High School aged students attend primarily the High Schools in the Yakima school district.  

As of October 2008, the district has an enrollment of 600 students.

Schools

Primary schools
Union Gap School

External links

Union Gap School District Report Card

School districts in Washington (state)
Education in Yakima County, Washington